Mellifont Abbey (literally 'the Big Monastery'), was a Cistercian abbey located close to Drogheda in County Louth, Ireland. It was the first abbey of the order to be built in Ireland. In 1152, it hosted the Synod of Kells-Mellifont. After its dissolution in 1539, the abbey became a private manor house. This saw the signing of the Treaty of Mellifont in 1603 and served as William of Orange's headquarters in 1690 during the Battle of the Boyne.

Today, the ruined abbey is a national monument of Ireland and accessible to the public. The English language name for the monastery, 'Mellifont', comes from the Latin phrase  Melli-fons, meaning 'Font of Honey'.

Location
Mellifont Abbey sits on the banks of the River Mattock, some 10 km (6 miles) north-west of Drogheda.

History

Origins

The abbey was founded in 1142 on the orders of Saint Malachy, Archbishop of Armagh. By 1170, Mellifont had one hundred monks and three hundred lay brothers. The abbey became the model for other Cistercian abbeys built in Ireland, with its formal style of architecture imported from the abbeys of the same order in France; it was the main abbey in Ireland until its dissolution. Other Cistercian houses in Ireland were often called "the daughters of Mellifont". From about 1275 they were free from English control.

The Synod of 1152

An important synod was held in Mellifont in 1152 as recorded in the Annals of the Four Masters, which states that the synod was attended by bishops and kings along with the Papal Legate, Giovanni Cardinal Paparoni (also known as John Cardinal Paparo; Saint Malachy had died some four years earlier). The consecration of the church took place in 1157 and asserted Church authority by banishing the King of Meath, Donnchadh Ua Maeleachlainn.

Various kings gave donations to assist this foundation: Muirchertach Ua Lochlainn, provincial king of Ulster, gave cattle, some gold and also a local townland, Donnchad Ua Cearbhall, the king of Airgialla (Oriel), who had donated the land, also gave gold, while Derbforgaill, the wife of Tigernan Ua Ruairc gave gold, a chalice and altar cloths.

After dissolution
The abbey was dissolved in 1539, when it became a fortified house, built there by Edward Moore in 1556 with materials taken from the old abbey.

In 1603 the Treaty of Mellifont was agreed between the English Crown and Hugh O'Neill, Earl of Tyrone, in the abbey grounds. Mellifont was then the property of The 1st Viscount Moore, who was a close friend of Lord Tyrone, and helped persuade him to sign the Treaty. The Moore family, who later became Earls of Drogheda, remained the owners of Mellifont until 1727.

William of Orange used Mellifont Abbey House as his headquarters during the Battle of the Boyne in 1690.

Description
Mellifont Abbey is now a ruin. Little of the original abbey remains, save a 13th-century lavabo (where the monks washed their hands before eating), some Romanesque arches and a 14th-century chapter house.

Burials
Tommaltach Ua Conchobair

New Mellifont Abbey
New Mellifont Abbey is home to the Cistercian monks and is located in Collon, a small village and townland in the southwest corner of County Louth, on the N2 national primary road. Supported by Cardinal McRory, it was re-established in 1938 by monks from Mount Melleray Abbey who purchased Oriel Temple, the residence of Lord Massareene (formerly the residence of First Baron Oriel John Foster MP the last Speaker of the Irish House of Commons), the land was originally owned by the old Mellifont Abbey. In 1945 it was elevated to the status of Abbey. As well as the Farm, they also operate a garden (Mellifont Abbey Gardens) and a nursery/garden centre which is open to the public. As with the Benedictine tradition the abbey offers a guest house for those wishing to stay.

In 1998 Dr. Sean Brady (future Cardinal) and Cardinal Cahal Daly officiated at a mass with the Mellifont community at the old Mellifont Abbey, to celebrate 900 years since the Cistercian order was established in Ireland, and the 850 anniversary of the death of St. Malachy, as well as the 60th anniversary of the re-establishment of the community.

In 2019 New Mellifont hosted Brothers and Sisters from Cistercian Communities in Ireland, and some from Scotland and England in celebrating the 900th anniversary of the first Cistercian charter of charity

Abbots/Superiors
 Dom Benignus Hickey(1893-1978)†, Superior (21/11/1938 – 22/01/1946); Abbot (22/01/1946 – 06/01/1967)
 Dom Gerard Kennedy†, Abbot (16/03/1967 – 03/04/1972)
 Dom Vincent Byrne, Sup. ad nutum 04/06/1972 – 20/08/1974)
 Dom Enda Ducey(1907-1992)†, Abbot (21/08/1974 – 27/05/1980) - became Abbot of Mount Melleray Abbey in 1980.
 Dom Finnian Power†, Abbot (27/05/1980 – 27/05/1986)
 Dom Francis Prendergast, Abbot (27/05/1986 – 27/05/1992)
 Dom Bernard Boyle(1926-2018)†, Abbot (27/05/1992 – 27/05/2004); Sup. ad nutum 2010
 Dom Augustine McGregor, Abbot (2004-2010) - became Abbot of Mount Melleray Abbey in 2010.
 Laurence McDermott(1929-2016)†, Superior ad nutum 2011 – 2012.
 Dom Brendan Freeman, Sup. ad nutum 2018, formerly Abbot of New Melleray Abbey from 1984-2013.
 Dom Richard Purcell, Pontifical Commissary 2014-2018 - Abbot of Roscrea then Mount Melleray

† Buried in Our Lady of Mellifont Abbey Cemetery, Collon, Co. Louth

See also
List of abbeys and priories in Ireland (County Louth)

References

External links 

 The Boyne Valley Tourist Portal - Info on and images of Old Mellifont Abbey
 

Buildings and structures in County Louth
Cistercian monasteries in the Republic of Ireland
Ruins in the Republic of Ireland
1142 establishments in Ireland
Religious organizations established in the 1140s
Religion in County Louth
Christian monasteries established in the 12th century
National Monuments in County Louth
Ruined abbeys and monasteries